The 2013–14 Washington Wizards season is the 53rd season of the franchise in the National Basketball Association (NBA), and the 41st in the Washington, D.C. area. Having a record of 44-38, their best record since the 2004-05 NBA season, including a 22-19 road record, their best since the 1996-97 NBA season as the Washington Bullets, the Wizards clinched  playoff berth for the first time since the 2007-08 NBA season. The team beat the Chicago Bulls in the first round of the 2014 NBA playoffs. It was only the third time a Wizards team advanced past the opening round since losing the 1979 NBA Finals. However, they lost to the Indiana Pacers in six games in the Eastern Conference Semifinals.

Key dates
 June 27: The 2013 NBA draft took place in Newark, New Jersey.
 July 1: The free agency period begun.

Draft picks

Roster

Pre-season

|- style="background:#fbb;"
| 1
| October 8
| Brooklyn
| 
| Nenê (19)
| Jan Veselý (12)
| John Wall (8)
| Verizon Center9,743
| 0–1
|- style="background:#fbb;"
| 2
| October 12
| Chicago
| 
| Bradley Beal (16)
| Jan Veselý (9)
| Eric Maynor (8)
| HSBC Arena (at Rio de Janeiro, Brazil)13,635
| 0–2
|- style="background:#cfc;"
| 3
| October 15
| Miami
| 
| Bradley Beal (29)
| Trevor Ariza (9)
| John Wall (8)
| Verizon Center13,678
| 1–2
|- style="background:#fbb;"
| 4
| October 17
| New York
| 
| Bradley Beal (21)
| Trevor Booker (9)
| John Wall (8)
| Baltimore Arena12,376
| 1–3
|- style="background:#fbb;"
| 5
| October 19
| @ New Orleans
| 
| Bradley Beal (30)
| Kevin Seraphin (9)
| John Wall (11)
| Rupp Arena14,980
| 1–4
|- style="background:#fbb;"
| 6
| October 22
| @ Detroit
| 
| Bradley Beal (17)
| Kevin Seraphin (11)
| Eric Maynor (5)
| Palace of Auburn Hills9,219
| 1–5
|- style="background:#cfc;"
| 7
| October 23
| @ Cleveland
| 
| Bradley Beal (21)
| Ariza & Maynor (8)
| Trevor Ariza (5)
| U.S. Bank Arena7,528
| 2–5

Regular season

Season standings

Game log

|- style="background:#fcc;"
| 1
| October 31
| @ Detroit
| 
| Trevor Ariza (28)
| Trevor Ariza (10)
| John Wall (11)
| The Palace of Auburn Hills18,891
| 0–1

|- style="background:#fcc;"
| 2
| November 1
| Philadelphia
| 
| John Wall (26)
| Trevor Ariza (14)
| Trevor ArizaJohn Wall (6)
| Verizon Center17,160
| 0–2
|- style="background:#fcc;"
| 3
| November 3
| @ Miami
| 
| Bradley Beal (19)
| Marcin Gortat (11)
| John Wall (9)
| American Airlines Arena19,600
| 0–3
|- style="background:#cfc;"
| 4
| November 6
| @ Philadelphia
| 
| John Wall (24)
| Marcin Gortat (12)
| John Wall (9)
| Wells Fargo Center10,117
| 1–3
|- style="background:#cfc;"
| 5
| November 8
| Brooklyn
| 
| Bradley Beal (29)
| Marcin Gortat (12)
| John Wall (14)
| Verizon Center17,215
| 2–3
|- style="background:#fcc;"
| 6
| November 10
| @ Oklahoma City
| 
| Bradley Beal (34)
| Marcin Gortat (8)
| John Wall (8)
| Chesapeake Energy Arena18,203
| 2–4
|- style="background:#fcc;"
| 7
| November 12
| @ Dallas
| 
| Trevor Ariza (27)
| Marcin Gortat (12)
| John Wall (10)
| American Airlines Center19,627
| 2–5
|- style="background:#fcc;"
| 8
| November 13
| @ San Antonio
| 
| Martell Webster (21)
| Martell Webster (10)
| Marcin GortatJohn Wall (3)
| AT&T Center18,581
| 2–6
|- style="background:#fcc;"
| 9
| November 16
| Cleveland
| 
| Bradley Beal (28)
| Marcin Gortat (11)
| John Wall (12)
| Verizon Center18,038
| 2–7
|- style="background:#cfc;"
| 10
| November 19
| Minnesota
| 
| Bradley Beal (25)
| Martell Webster (9)
| John Wall (16)
| Verizon Center14,804
| 3–7
|- style="background:#cfc;"
| 11
| November 20
| @ Cleveland
| 
| Bradley Beal (26)
| NenêJan Veselý (8)
| John Wall (8)
| Verizon Center16,189
| 4–7
|- style="background:#fcc;"
| 12
| November 22
| @ Toronto
| 
| John Wall (37)
| Nenê (10)
| Martell Webster (5)
| Air Canada Centre16,705
| 4–8
|- style="background:#cfc;"
| 13
| November 23
| New York
| 
| John Wall (31)
| Marcin Gortat (17)
| John Wall (7)
| Verizon Center18,089
| 5–8
|- style="background:#cfc;"
| 14
| November 26
| L. A. Lakers
| 
| John Wall (31)
| Martell Webster (9)
| John Wall (9)
| Verizon Center19,204
| 6–8
|- style="background:#cfc;"
| 15
| November 27
| @ Milwaukee
| 
| Marcin Gortat (25)
| Marcin GortatNenê (8)
| Martell Webster (7)
| Bradley Center11,584
| 7–8
|- style="background:#fcc;"
| 16
| November 29
| @ Indiana
| 
| Marcin Gortat (17)
| Martell Webster (10)
| John Wall (9)
| Conseco Fieldhouse18,165
| 7–9
|- style="background:#cfc;"
| 17
| November 30
| Atlanta
| 
| John Wall (26)
| Nenê (12)
| John Wall (12)
| Verizon Center14,280
| 8–9

|- style="background:#cfc;"
| 18
| December 2
| Orlando
| 
| Trevor Ariza (24)
| Trevor Booker (8)
| John Wall (13)
| Verizon Center12,809
| 9–9
|- style="background:#fcc;"
| 19
| December 6
| Milwaukee
| 
| John Wall (30)
| Trevor Ariza (12)
| John Wall (8)
| Verizon Center18,194
| 9–10
|- style="background:#fcc;"
| 20
| December 9
| Denver
| 
| John Wall (20)
| Trevor Booker (12)
| John Wall (8)
| Verizon Center13,293
| 9–11
|- style="background:#fcc;"
| 21
| December 13
| @ Atlanta
| 
| Trevor Booker (24)
| Trevor Booker (14)
| John Wall (11)
| Philips Arena11,251
| 9–12
|- style="background:#fcc;"
| 22
| December 14
| L. A. Clippers
| 
| John Wall (24)
| Trevor BookerMarcin Gortat (7)
| John Wall (12)
| Verizon Center16,509
| 9–13
|- style="background:#cfc;"
| 23
| December 16
| @ New York
| 
| Martell Webster (30)
| Bradley BealMarcin Gortat (7)
| John Wall (8)
| Madison Square Garden19,033
| 10–13
|- style="background:#cfc;"
| 24
| December 18
| @ Brooklyn
| 
| John Wall (21)
| Trevor Booker (13)
| John Wall (6)
| Barclays Center16,187
| 11–13
|- style="background:#cfc;"
| 25
| December 21
| @ Boston
| 
| Trevor Ariza (27)
| Marcin Gortat (11)
| John Wall (9)
| TD Garden18,169
| 12–13
|- style="background:#fcc;"
| 26
| December 27
| @ Minnesota
| 
| John Wall (26)
| Trevor Booker (9)
| John Wall (7)
| Target Center16,473
| 12–14
|- style="background:#cfc;"
| 27
| December 28
| Detroit
| 
| John Wall (20)
| Trevor Booker (9)
| John Wall (11)
| Verizon Center19,336
| 13–14
|- style="background:#cfc;"
| 28
| December 30
| @ Detroit
| 
| John Wall (29)
| Trevor Ariza (11)
| John Wall (7)
| The Palace of Auburn Hills15,050
| 14–14

|- style="background:#fcc;"
| 29
| January 1
| Dallas
| 
| John Wall (22)
| Trevor Booker (19)
| John Wall (5)
| Verizon Center15,713
| 14–15
|- style="background:#fcc;"
| 30
| January 3
| Toronto
| 
| Bradley BealMartell Webster (12)
| Trevor Booker (13)
| John Wall (6)
| Verizon Center14,940
| 14–16
|- style="background:#fcc;"
| 31
| January 5
| Golden State
| 
| Bradley BealJohn Wall (14)
| Trevor BookerMarcin GortatJan Veselý (6)
| John Wall (10)
| Verizon Center17,390
| 14–17
|- style="background:#cfc;"
| 32
| January 7
| @ Charlotte
| 
| Bradley Beal (21)
| Marcin Gortat (13)
| John Wall (8)
| Time Warner Cable Arena12,079
| 15–17
|- style="background:#cfc;"
| 33
| January 8
| @ New Orleans
| 
| Trevor Ariza (21)
| Marcin Gortat (14)
| Garrett Temple,John Wall (6)
| New Orleans Arena17,557
| 16–17
|- style="background:#fcc;"
| 34
| January 10
| @ Indiana
| 
| Bradley Beal (17)
| Marcin Gortat (9)
| Trevor Ariza (5)
| Conseco Fieldhouse18,165
| 16-18
|- style="background:#fcc;"
| 35
| January 11
| Houston
| 
| Trevor ArizaJohn Wall (23)
| Trevor Ariza (14)
| John Wall (10)
| Verizon Center17,454
| 16–19
|- style="background:#cfc;"
| 36
| January 13
| @ Chicago
| 
| NenêJohn Wall (19)
| Marcin Gortat (11)
| John Wall (7)
| United Center21,287
| 17–19
|- style="background:#cfc;"
| 37
| January 15
| Miami
| 
| John Wall (25)
| Trevor Booker (11)
| NenêJohn Wall (9)
| Verizon Center20,356
| 18–19
|- style="background:#cfc;"
| 38
| January 17
| Chicago
| 
| John Wall (23)
| Trevor Ariza (8)
| John Wall (11)
| Verizon Center17,005
| 19–19
|- style="background:#fcc;"
| 39
| January 18
| Detroit
| 
| John Wall (34)
| Marcin Gortat (12)
| Trevor Ariza (7)
| Verizon Center17,039
| 19–20
|- style="background:#cfc;"
| 40
| January 20
| Philadelphia
| 
| Bradley Beal (22)
| Marcin Gortat (11)
| Bradley Beal (8)
| Verizon Center18,650
| 20–20
|- style="background:#fcc;"
| 41
| January 22
| Boston
| 
| John Wall (28)
| Marcin Gortat (13)
| John Wall (10)
| Verizon Center14,492
| 20–21
|- style="background:#cfc;"
| 42
| January 24
| @ Phoenix
| 
| Trevor Ariza (23)
| Nenê (8)
| John Wall (12)
| US Airways Center16,198
| 21–21
|- style="background:#fcc;"
| 43
| January 25
| @ Utah
| 
| Trevor Ariza (23)
| Marcin Gortat (11)
| Bradley Beal (8)
| EnergySolutions Arena17,754
| 21-22
|- style="background:#cfc;"
| 44
| January 28
| @ Golden State
| 
| Bradley Beal (20)
| Marcin Gortat (12)
| John Wall (5)
| Oracle Arena19,596
| 22–22
|- style="background:#fcc;"
| 45
| January 29
| @ L.A. Clippers
| 
| Bradley Beal (20)
| Nenê (8)
| John Wall (11)
| Staples Center19,060
| 22–23

|- style="background:#cfc;"
| 46
| February 1
| Oklahoma City
| 
| Trevor Ariza (18)
| Marcin Gortat (14)
| John Wall (15)
| Verizon Center20,356
| 23–23
|- style="background:#cfc;"
| 47
| February 3
| Portland
| 
| John Wall (22)
| Marcin Gortat (11)
| John Wall (6)
| Verizon Center13,259
| 24–23
|- style="background:#fcc;"
| 48
| February 5
| San Antonio
| 
| John Wall (29)
| Trevor Ariza (10)
| John Wall (9)
| Verizon Center15,791
| 24–24
|- style="background:#fcc;"
| 49
| February 7
| Cleveland
| 
| John Wall (32)
| Nenê,Marcin Gortat (8)
| John Wall (10)
| Verizon Center16,294
| 24–25
|- style="background:#cfc;"
| 50
| February 9
| Sacramento
| 
| Nenê (18)
| Marcin Gortat (8)
| NenêBradley Beal (5)
| Verizon Center18,173
| 25–25
|- style="background:#fcc;"
| 51
| February 11
| @ Memphis
| 
| Bradley Beal (37)
| Marcin Gortat (6)
| John Wall (5)
| FedExForum15,613
| 25–26
|- style="background:#fcc;"
| 52
| February 12
| @ Houston
| 
| Trevor Ariza (32)
| Trevor Ariza (11)
| John Wall (14)
| Toyota Center18,314
| 25–27
|- align="center"
|colspan="9" bgcolor="#bbcaff"|All-Star Break
|- style="background:#fcc;"
| 53
| February 18
| Toronto
| 
| John Wall (22)
| Trevor ArizaMarcin Gortat (11)
| John Wall (7)
| Verizon Center15,624
| 25–28
|- style="background:#cfc;"
| 54
| February 19
| @ Atlanta
| 
| John Wall (21)
| Marcin Gortat (12)
| John Wall (12)
| Philips Arena13,529
| 26–28
|- style="background:#cfc;"
| 55
| February 22
| New Orleans
| 
| Nenê (30)
| Marcin Gortat (10)
| John Wall (12)
| Verizon Center18,385
| 27–28
|- style="background:#cfc;"
| 56
| February 23
| @ Cleveland
| 
| John Wall (21)
| Marcin Gortat (13)
| John Wall (9)
| Quicken Loans Arena17,238
| 28–28
|- style="background:#cfc;"
| 57
| February 25
| Orlando
| 
| John Wall (27)
| Marcin Gortat (10)
| John Wall (7)
| Verizon Center13,306
| 29–28
|- style="background:#cfc;"
| 58
| February 27
| @ Toronto
| 
| Marcin GortatJohn Wall (31)
| Marcin Gortat (12)
| John Wall (9)
| Air Canada Centre17,758
| 30–28

|- style="background:#cfc;"
| 59
| March 1
| @ Philadelphia
| 
| Trevor Ariza (40)
| Marcin Gortat (14)
| John Wall (16)
| Wells Fargo Center20,856
| 31–28
|- style="background:#fcc;"
| 60
| March 3
| Memphis
| 
| John Wall (23)
| Marcin Gortat (8)
| John Wall (9)
| Verizon Center14,065
| 31–29
|- style="background:#cfc;"
| 61
| March 5
| Utah
| 
| Trevor Ariza (26)
| Marcin Gortat (9)
| John Wall (10)
| Verizon Center13,911
| 32–29
|- style="background:#cfc;"
| 62
| March 8
| @ Milwaukee
| 
| Trevor Ariza (28)
| Trevor Ariza (7)
| John Wall (13)
| BMO Harris Bradley Center14,839
| 33–29
|- style="background:#fcc;"
| 63
| March 10
| @ Miami
| 
| Bradley Beal (18)
| Marcin Gortat (18)
| John Wall (8)
| American Airlines Arena19,657
| 33–30
|- style="background:#fcc;"
| 64
| March 12
| Charlotte
| 
| John Wall (23)
| Marcin Gortat (10)
| Andre Miller (5)
| Verizon Center17,220
| 33–31
|- style="background:#cfc;"
| 65
| March 14
| @ Orlando
| 
| Ariza & Wall (21)
| Marcin Gortat (14)
| John Wall (11)
| Amway Center16,011
| 34–31
|- style="background:#cfc;"
| 66
| March 15
| Brooklyn
| 
| John Wall (33)
| Drew Gooden (9)
| John Wall (6)
| Verizon Center20,356
| 35–31
|- style="background:#fcc;"
| 67
| March 18
| @ Sacramento
| 
| Beal  & Gortat (19)
| Marcin Gortat (14)
| John Wall (8)
| Sleep Train Arena16,084
| 35–32
|- style="background:#fcc;"
| 68
| March 20
| @ Portland
| 
| John Wall (24)
| Ariza & Gooden (9)
| John Wall (14)
| Moda Center19,571
| 35–33
|- style="background:#cfc;"
| 69
| March 21
| @ L.A. Lakers
| 
| John Wall (28)
| Marcin Gortat (13)
| John Wall (14)
| Staples Center18,112
| 36–33
|- style="background:#fcc;"
| 70
| March 23
| @ Denver
| 
| Bradley Beal (21)
| Marcin Gortat (10)
| Marcin Gortat (5)
| Pepsi Center18,324
| 36–34
|- style="background:#fcc;"
| 71
| March 26
| Phoenix
| 
| John Wall (29)
| Trevor Ariza (8)
| John Wall (6)
| Verizon Center18,805
| 36–35
|- style="background:#cfc;"
| 72
| March 28
| Indiana
| 
| John Wall (20)
| Marcin Gortat (12)
| John Wall (8)
| Verizon Center19,708
| 37–35
|- style="background:#cfc;"
| 73
| March 29
| Atlanta
| 
| John Wall (25)
| Marcin Gortat (11)
| John Wall (6)
| Verizon Center17,996
| 38–35
|- style="background:#fcc;"
| 74
| March 31
| @ Charlotte
| 
| Bradley Beal (20)
| Marcin Gortat (11)
| Andre Miller (9)
| Time Warner Cable Arena14,894
| 38–36

|- style="background:#cfc;"
| 75
| April 2
| Boston
| 
| Marcin Gortat (22)
| Marcin Gortat (8)
| John Wall (10)
| Verizon Center17,770
| 39–36
|- style="background:#cfc;"
| 76
| April 4
| @ New York
| 
| Bradley Beal (28)
| Marcin Gortat (10)
| John Wall (9)
| Madison Square Garden19,812
| 40–36
|- style="background:#fcc;"
| 77
| April 5
| Chicago
| 
| John Wall (20)
| Marcin Gortat (8)
| John Wall (6)
| Verizon Center19,661
| 40–37
|- style="background:#fcc;"
| 78
| April 9
| Charlotte
| 
| Marcin Gortat (27)
| Marcin Gortat (14)
| John Wall (11)
| Verizon Center17,784
| 40–38
|- style="background:#cfc;"
| 79
| April 11
| @ Orlando
| 
| Nenê (17)
| Porter & Harrington (9)
| John Wall (12)
| Amway Center17,009
| 41–38
|- style="background:#cfc;"
| 80
| April 12
| Milwaukee
| 
| Bradley Beal (26)
| Marcin Gortat (13)
| John Wall (8)
| Verizon Center17,278
| 42–38
|- style="background:#cfc;"
| 81
| April 14
| Miami
| 
| Trevor Ariza (25)
| Marcin Gortat (13)
| John Wall (13)
| Verizon Center20,356
| 43-38
|- style="background:#cfc;"
| 82
| April 16
| @ Boston
| 
| Bradley Beal (27)
| Marcin Gortat (10)
| John Wall (9)
| TD Garden18,624
| 44–38

Playoffs

Game log

|- style="background:#cfc;"
| 1
| April 20
| @ Chicago
|  
| Nenê (24)
| Marcin Gortat (13)
| Bradley Beal (7)
| United Center21,694
| 1–0
|- style="background:#cfc;"
| 2
| April 22
| @ Chicago
|  
| Bradley Beal (26)
| Ariza & Booker (8)
| Ariza & Wall (7)
| United Center21,663
| 2–0
|- style="background:#fbb;"
| 3
| April 25
| Chicago
| 
| Bradley Beal (25)
| Gortat & Ariza (11)
| John Wall (7)
| Verizon Center23,356
| 2–1
|- style="background:#cfc;"
| 4
| April 27
| Chicago
| 
| Trevor Ariza (30)
| Trevor Booker (9)
| John Wall (10)
| Verizon Center20,356
| 3–1
|- style="background:#cfc;"
| 5
| April 29
| @ Chicago
| 
| John Wall (24)
| Marcin Gortat (13)
| Nenê, Beal & Wall (4)
| United Center21,752
| 4–1

|- style="background:#cfc;"
| 1
| May 5
| @ Indiana
| 
| Bradley Beal (25)
| Marcin Gortat (15)
| John Wall (9)
| Bankers Life Fieldhouse18,165
| 1–0
|- style="background:#fbb;"
| 2
| May 7
| @ Indiana
| 
| Marcin Gortat (21)
| Marcin Gortat (11)
| John Wall (8)
| Bankers Life Fieldhouse18,165
| 1–1
|- style="background:#fbb;"
| 3
| May 9
| Indiana
|  
| Bradley Beal (16)
| Trevor Ariza (15)
| John Wall (6)
| Verizon Center20,356
| 1–2
|- style="background:#fbb;"
| 4
| May 11
| Indiana
|  
| Bradley Beal (20)
| Trevor Ariza (9)
| John Wall (7)
| Verizon Center20,356
| 1–3
|- style="background:#cfc;"
| 5
| May 13
| @ Indiana
| 
| Marcin Gortat (31)
| Marcin Gortat (16)
| Ariza & Wall (5)
| Bankers Life Fieldhouse18,165
| 2–3
|- style="background:#fbb;"
| 6
| May 15
| Indiana
|  
| Marcin Gortat (19)
| Trevor Ariza (7)
| John Wall (9)
| Verizon Center19,502
| 2–4

Injuries and surgeries

Transactions

Overview

Trades

Free agents

References

Washington Wizards seasons
Washington Wizards
Wash
Wash